Luis Alberto Raven Enríquez (born November 19, 1968) is a former Venezuelan professional baseball outfielder. Listed at 6'0", 185 lb., Raven batted and threw right handed. He was born in La Guaira, Vargas.

Raven (rah'-vehn) was a powerful hitter known for his long home runs, but he also struck out frequently and usually posted a low batting average and on-base percentage.

Career
He spent 19 years in baseball, while playing in the California Angels, Chicago White Sox, Cleveland Indians and Florida Marlins minor league systems. Besides, he played in Mexican and Italian baseball, as well as in the Venezuelan Professional Baseball League.

In 15 minor league seasons, he posted a .288 batting average with 197 home runs and 838 RBI in 1151 games, including 2118 total bases for a .494 slugging average.

Raven played from 1991 through 2007 in the Venezuela league, gaining honors as Rookie of the Year in the 1993–1994 season, Most Valuable Offensive Player in 1997–1998 and 1998–1999, and Most Valuable Player in 1998–1999.

Overall, he hit .267 with 94 homers and 401 RBI in 703 games, while collecting 319 runs, 123 doubles, eight triples and 21 stolen bases. In between, he made the Caribbean Series All-Star team in  the 1997 and 2001 tournaments.

Raven suffered a stroke in January 2014. He has recovered since then.

Sources
Gutiérrez, Daniel; Alvarez, Efraim; Gutiérrez (h), Daniel (2006). La Enciclopedia del Béisbol en Venezuela. LVBP, Caracas.

References

External links
Baseball Reference (Minors)
Venezuelan Professional Baseball League Statistics

1968 births
Living people
Acereros de Monclova players
Águilas del Zulia players
Arizona League Angels players
Baseball first basemen
Baseball third basemen
Baseball outfielders
Birmingham Barons players
Boise Hawks players
Calgary Cannons players
Canton-Akron Indians players
Cardenales de Lara players
Caribes de Oriente players
Charlotte Knights players
Guerreros de Oaxaca players
Lake Elsinore Storm players
Langosteros de Cancún players
Leones del Caracas players
Leones de Yucatán players
Lincoln Saltdogs players
Long Island Ducks players
Midland Angels players
Navegantes del Magallanes players
Palm Springs Angels players
Pastora de los Llanos players
People from La Guaira
Sioux City Explorers players
T & A San Marino players
Tiburones de La Guaira players
Vancouver Canadians players
Venezuelan expatriate baseball players in Canada
Venezuelan expatriate baseball players in Mexico
Venezuelan expatriate baseball players in the United States
Venezuelan expatriate baseball players in San Marino
Winnipeg Goldeyes players